Leggett Independent School District is a public school district based in the community of Leggett, Texas (USA).  In addition to the community of Leggett, Leggett ISD also serves some of the town of Seven Oaks.

The district has two campuses - Leggett High (Grades 7-12) and Leggett Elementary (Grades PK-6).

In 2009, the school district was rated "academically acceptable" by the Texas Education Agency.

References

External links
Leggett ISD

School districts in Polk County, Texas